Mabudachi (English: Bad Company) is a 2001 Japanese film written and directed by Tomoyuki Furumaya. It stars Ryosuke Takahashi.

External links
 

2001 films
Films directed by Tomoyuki Furumaya
2000s Japanese-language films
2001 drama films
Japanese drama films
2000s Japanese films